Blood Warrior, known in Japan as , is a 1993 fighting arcade game developed by Atop and published by Kaneko. It is the successor to the 1992 fighting arcade game, Shogun Warriors, also developed by Atop and published by Kaneko. Unlike Shogun Warriors, Blood Warrior uses digitized images of real actors within the game instead of traditionally drawn sprites, and its addition of blood and gore draws similarities to Midway's Mortal Kombat franchise.

Characters
There are nine playable characters.  Like its predecessor, the Japanese version contains original voice samples, while the North American and Worldwide versions were dubbed in English for some characters.

  - Based on Samurai from Shogun Warriors.
 - Based on Ninja from Shogun Warriors.
 - A ksitigarbha.
 - A kunoichi.
 - A kappa.
, also known as Shigerutsuki - Resembles Shogun from Shogun Warriors, but his actual occupation is a samurai.
 - Based on Kabuki from Shogun Warriors.
 - Based on Saitō Musashibō Benkei, but has a different look compared to himself in Shogun Warriors.
  - Based on Ishikawa Goemon.

Reception 
In Japan, Game Machine listed Blood Warrior on their September 1, 1994 issue as being the seventeenth most-successful table arcade unit of the month.

See also
 The Kung-Fu Master Jackie Chan - another Mortal Kombat-inspired fighting arcade game released by Kaneko.

References

External links

Blood Warrior at arcade-history

1993 video games
Arcade video games
Arcade-only video games
Kaneko games
Multiplayer video games
Fighting games
Video games about ninja
Video games about samurai
Video games developed in Japan
Video games with digitized sprites